Chrysocephalum, known by the common name everlastings for their long life as cut flowers, is a genus of flowering plants in the family Asteraceae. There are nine species, all of which were formerly classified under other genera (Helichrysum, Helipterum and Leptorhynchos).

 Species
All the species are endemic to Australia.
 Chrysocephalum apiculatum (Labill.) Steetz  - common everlasting, yellow buttons
 Chrysocephalum baxteri (A.Cunn. ex DC.) Anderb.
 Chrysocephalum eremaeum (Haegi) Anderb. 
 Chrysocephalum gilesii (F.Muell.) Paul G.Wilson
 Chrysocephalum pterochaetum  F.Muell. - perennial sunray
 Chrysocephalum puteale  (S.Moore) Paul G.Wilson 
 Chrysocephalum semipapposum  (Labill.) Steetz - clustered everlasting, yellow buttons
 Chrysocephalum sericeum Paul G.Wilson
 Chrysocephalum vitellinum Paul G.Wilson

Gallery

References

 FloraBase - the Western Australian Flora: Chrysocephalum 
 PlantNET - Flora of New South Wales Online: Chrysocephalum
 Association of Societies for Growing Australian Plants (ASGAP): Chrysocephalum apiculatum

Gnaphalieae
Endemic flora of Australia
Asteraceae genera